is a Japanese manga series written and illustrated by Madoka Kashihara. It was serialized in Kodansha's shōnen manga magazine Bessatsu Shōnen Magazine from April 2020 to March 2023. An anime television series adaptation by Studio Flad aired from October to December 2022.

Characters

 /

Production
Madoka Kashihara draws the manga with her iPad Pro.

Media

Manga
Written and illustrated by Madoka Kashihara, The Little Lies We All Tell was serialized in Kodansha's shōnen manga magazine Bessatsu Shōnen Magazine from April 9, 2020, to March 9, 2023. Kodansha has collected its chapters into individual tankōbon volumes. The first volume was released on December 17, 2020. As of April 7, 2022, two volumes have been released.

Volume list

Anime
In March 2022, it was announced that the series would receive an anime television series adaptation. It is produced by Studio Flad and directed by Makoto Hoshino, with scripts written by Megumi Shimizu, character designs handled by Ruriko Watanabe, and music composed by Tomoki Kikuya. The series aired from October 16 to December 25, 2022, on ABC and TV Asahi's  programming block. The opening theme song is "Eclipse" by Nacherry, a voice unit composed of Chiemi Tanaka and Natsumi Murakami, while ending theme song is "For 4 Forever" by Chiemi Tanaka, Natsumi Murakami, Ayane Sakura and Megumi Han as their respective characters. Crunchyroll licensed the series.

Episode list

Reception
Anime News Network had three editors review the first episode of the anime: Richard Eisenbeis was critical of the show's "general comedic premise" being lesser and too similar to Spy x Family, but noted that it went for "slightly taboo humor" in the vein of Please Tell Me! Galko-chan, concluding that: "While there's nothing overtly "wrong" or "bad" about this show, I feel that it lives or dies based on how much you enjoy the humor. It's a show that you really should try out for yourself and then go on from there." Caitlin Moore was initially put off by the first few minutes with its early revelation of the characters' secrets and potential transphobic humor involving Tsubasa/Tsuyoshi, but was pleasantly surprised by the lack of the latter and praised the show's template of being a gag anime similar to "30 Rock with the chaotic energy of Asobi Asobase." Nicholas Dupree criticized the premiere for being filled with "tired, low-energy comedy that occasionally stumbles into a sensible chuckle but otherwise sits around repeating itself," and failing to replicate Kaguya-samas comedic style due to an unpolished production, calling it "a show that is trying just hard enough that it's embarrassing when the jokes don't land, but not trying hard enough to feel like earnest comedy, which is a really dull valley to get caught in."

Moore reviewed the complete anime series in 2023 and gave it an overall B grade. Despite finding some "middling animation and forgettable music" throughout the production, she called it "one of the most consistently funny, occasionally surprising comedies of the season", praising its balance of delivering "K-ON!-style iyashikei" and Asobi Asobases "gross-out humor" with "an almost subversive undertone" to them, concluding that "The Little Lies We All Tell wasn't the most remarkable series of Fall 2022, but I found it to be the one I watched most consistently. Every week, I could look forward to coming home from a challenging day at work, kicking off my shoes, and enjoying an episode I knew would make me laugh without the well-worn anime tropes that frustrate me or ask me to think too hard. Sometimes, that's all you want or need."

Notes

References

External links
  
  
 

Anime series based on manga
Asahi Broadcasting Corporation original programming
Comedy anime and manga
Cross-dressing in anime and manga
Crunchyroll anime
Extraterrestrials in anime and manga
Kodansha manga
Ninja in anime and manga
School life in anime and manga
Shōnen manga
Studio Flad